Hi-Hi is a Japanese comedy (manzai) duo (kombi) from Saitama prefecture consisting of  as boke and  as tsukkomi under the entertainment agency, K Dash Stage. Formed in 1998, they are best known for their stand-up acts and TV tarento activities in variety shows. The duo was selected as one of the four finalists among 1,515 professional comedy groups in a televised competition called THE MANZAI 2011, broadcast by Fuji Television on December 17, 2011.

Biography 

Ueda and Iwasaki first met while they were students at Kawaguchi Seiryo High School in Saitama prefecture. After graduation, they formed a musical band with two other members. Two years later, following the break-up of the band, Ueda and Iwasaki joined the entertainment company Yoshimoto Kogyo in 1993. In a Yoshimoto event called "Risutora event" (restructuring event), however, the duo was selected as a group that would let go from Yoshimoto due to incompetent performance, after only two years since they joined. Although the company management told them they could come back after a while, Ueda and Iwasaki lost confidence and motivation and left Yoshimoto, and gave up their careers as comedians.

They made a living as truck drivers and gamblers at pachinko slot games. In the meantime, they restarted their activities as a band man. Ueda and Iwasaki played the bass and drums respectively in a band that was initially called "Zari Killer" and performed punk rocks. Later, the band renamed itself "Gum gum 3 channel" and performed a pop music inspired by Mr. Children (a Japanese popular pop band).

After three years of this stint, they passed a comedian audition held at K Dash Stage, Ueda and Iwasaki came back to the career as a comedian in 1998. However, they had not succeeded in raising their profile in the show biz world for 13 years until they earned the finalist position in the manzai competition mentioned above. Soon after this event, Hi-Hi gained more than 100 offers from a variety of media including +50 offers from TV programs.

Performance 

Ueda has made all their manzai dialogues. In manzai, Ueda is characterized as a sloppy, fickle and silly one while Iwasaki as a reasonable one. Their performance usually starts with Ueda's hail "Domo-ne! Waratte-ne! Kii-tsukatte-ne! Saikin Doh?" (Hi guys! Please laugh! Please be nice to us! How are you guys!?) followed by his totally meaningless line such as "Do you twirl pasta lately?", "Do you zip lately?", "Do you close curtains lately?", etc. Then, usually Iwasaki warns him "Too friendly (to the audience)! What are you saying..." and moved on to a main dialogue, saying "Listen, I am thinking I would like to...(i.e. travel abroad, buy a pet, ride a motorcycle, etc.)." Ueda does not respond properly, acts as if dropping things that has just popped up in his mind, and keeps shooting silly comments. In the end, Iwasaki closes their dialogue saying "Mo i-ya!" (Enough!).

Members 
 
 Manzai Role: Boke
 Date of Birth: 
 Birthplace: Hatogaya (currently Kawaguchi), Saitama

 
 Manzai Role: Tsukkomi
 Date of Birth: 
 Birthplace: Ōmiya, Saitama. Grew up in Kashiwa, Chiba

Media

TV 
Past Appearance
THE MANZAI 2011--Fuji Television
Guru Guru Ninety-Nine – Nippon Television
Bakusho Red Carpet – Fuji Television
Bakusho On-Air Battle – NHK

Radio 
Past Appearance
Hi-Hi no All Night Nippon R – Nippon Broadcasting System *January 6, 2012
Audrey no Shampoo Ojisan – Nippon Cultural Broadcasting *January 18/25 2012
Yompachi 48 hours – Tokyo FM *January 12, 2012
Hi-Hi no Gyara-kun—Nippon Cultural Broadcasting
Yoshida Terumi no Yaruki Man Man—Nippon Cultural Broadcasting

External links 
Hi-Hi official website provided by K Dash Stage
Kojiro Ueda's blog
Kazunori Iwasaki's Twitter
After School

Japanese comedy duos
Living people
1973 births
People from Kashiwa